Compsoctena ursulella is a moth in the family Eriocottidae. It was described by Francis Walker in 1863. It is found in Sierra Leone.

Adults are cinereous (ash gray), the forewings with diffuse black speckles and slightly rounded at the tips.

References

Moths described in 1863
Compsoctena
Lepidoptera of West Africa